Carl Edwin Brandt (August 15, 1914 – April 25, 1991) was an American musician who was prolific as a composer and arranger for recording artists, television, and film.

Early life 
Born and raised in Sacramento, Brandt played clarinet, violin, and saxophone with The Dick Jurgens Orchestra before joining the United States Air Force during World War II.

Career 
After the war, he moved to Los Angeles and began composing and arranging music for television, film, and recording artists. Brandt scored music for I Spy, The Danny Thomas Show, The Mod Squad, and Eight is Enough. Of his many positions in Los Angeles, Brandt was a staff composer and arranger for Warner Bros.

References 

Jazz musicians from California
American jazz composers
American male jazz composers
United States Army Air Forces personnel of World War II
Warner Records artists
20th-century American composers
1914 births
1991 deaths
20th-century American male musicians
20th-century jazz composers
Musicians from Sacramento, California